Sohlman is surname of:

 (1824–1874), Swedish journalist and politician
Ragnar Sohlman (1870–1948)
12199 Sohlman (1980 TK6), a main-belt asteroid discovered on 1980 by L. V. Zhuravleva
Mikael Gabriel (1990-), Finnish rapper (surname Sohlman)

Swedish-language surnames
Swedish families